Osvaldo Andrade Lara (born 2 June 1953 in Santiago) is a Chilean Socialist politician. After studying law at the Pontifical Catholic University of Chile, Andrade joined the Socialist Party in 1968. He served as director of the Young Socialists. Following the Chilean coup of 1973, he was detained at the Estadio Nacional and at Villa Grimaldi. He was Minister of Labor and Social Security in the government of Chilean President Michelle Bachelet from 2006 to 2008. On 22 March 2016 he became President of the Chamber of Deputies. He succeeded Marco Antonio Núñez.

Andrade was a 6-foot tall (1.83m) guard for the Chilean national basketball team in the 1970s.

References

External links

1953 births
Living people
People from Santiago
People from Puente Alto
Chilean people of Galician descent
Socialist Party of Chile politicians
Government ministers of Chile
Presidents of the Chamber of Deputies of Chile
Deputies of the LIII Legislative Period of the National Congress of Chile
Deputies of the LIV Legislative Period of the National Congress of Chile
Pontifical Catholic University of Chile alumni
University of Salamanca alumni